The 2017 Mae Young Classic was a multi-night special event and tournament promoted by the American professional wrestling promotion, WWE. It was constituted by a 32-competitor tournament for women from WWE's NXT brand division and wrestlers from the independent circuit. The majority of the tournament took place at Full Sail University in Winter Park, Florida and was taped from July 13–14, 2017; these matches aired on the WWE Network on August 28 (round 1) and September 4 (round 2, quarterfinals, and semifinals). The tournament final match aired live on the WWE Network on September 12 and took place at the Thomas & Mack Center in Paradise, Nevada. The event was named in honor of Mae Young. The winner of the inaugural tournament was Kairi Sane.

The 2017 Mae Young Classic also featured WWE's first full-time female referee, Jessika Carr. A second edition of the tournament was held in the summer and fall of 2018.

Background 

At a press conference during the weekend of WrestleMania 33, the American professional wrestling promotion WWE announced that a women's tournament would be taking place in the summer of 2017, with a total of 32 wrestlers competing. It was also announced that the tournament would be among wrestlers from WWE's NXT brand and wrestlers from the independent circuit. The event was named in honor of the late WWE Hall of Famer Mae Young, who is considered a pioneer of women's wrestling. The first four wrestlers announced to be competing were Sarah Logan, Lacey Evans, Princesa Sugehit, and Toni Storm, with the rest revealed in the weeks leading up to the event. On June 26, Hall of Famers Lita and Jim Ross were announced as the commentators for the tournament.

On July 13, WWE held the Mae Young Classic: Parade of Champions, a pre-tournament event streamed live on YouTube and Facebook and revealed the remaining tournament participants. The Mae Young Classic also featured WWE's first full-time female referee, Jessika Carr. Round 1 up through the semifinals of the tournament were taped at Full Sail University in Winter Park, Florida on July 13 and 14 and aired on the WWE Network on August 28 (round 1) and September 4 (round 2, quarterfinals, and semifinals). The tournament final match aired live on September 12 from the Thomas & Mack Center in Paradise, Nevada, and was also streamed on the WWE Network.

Qualifying matches 
The tournament consisted of various matches that resulted from scripted storylines and had predetermined results.

 NXT tapings'' – June 23 (Full Sail University – Winter Park, Florida)

Participants

Replaced
This participant was taken out of the tournament for a specific reason and therefore was replaced by another competitor.

Alternates
If any of the official participants had suffered an injury, they would have been replaced by one of the following wrestlers:

Broadcast team

Referees

Results

Finale

Tournament bracket 
The following time limits were in place:
 Round one: 15 minutes
 Round two: 20 minutes
 Quarterfinals: 25 minutes
 Semifinals: 30 minutes
 Final: No time limit

Aftermath 
Performers on the tournament such as Bianca Belair, Dakota Kai, winner Kairi Sane, Lacey Evans, Reina González, Rhea Ripley, Sarah Logan, Taynara Conti, Vanessa Borne, Xia Li already had signed contracts with the company. Nixon Newell, who missed the tournament due to injury, also already signed a contract with the company.

On October 3, WWE officially announced that finalist Shayna Baszler had signed a contract with the company and started training at the WWE Performance Center. On October 15, 2017, WWE announced that performer Kavita Devi had signed a contract, and will start training at their Performance Center in January 2018.

On January 16, 2018, WWE announced that Candice LeRae had been signed to a contract, performing on the NXT brand.

On February 8, 2018, WWE announced that Serena Deeb had been signed by WWE to become a coach at the WWE Performance Center in Orlando, Florida.

On March 8, 2018, WWE officially announced that Abbey Laith and Sage Beckett were released from their NXT contracts.

In April 2018, a second Mae Young Classic tournament was scheduled for later that year.

On May 31, 2018, WWE announced that Deonna Purrazzo had been signed to a contract by WWE and will be performing in their developmental territory NXT.

On June 2, 2018, Zeda was released from her NXT contract.

Rhea Ripley, Rachel Evers, Xia Li, Mercedes Martinez, Taynara Conti, Kavita Devi, Reina González, Toni Storm, alternate Deonna Purrazzo, and Nixon Newell (under the ring name Tegan Nox) all competed in the 2018 Mae Young Classic tournament.

On January 12, 2019, Toni Storm defeated Rhea Ripley to win the NXT UK Women's Championship.

On February 27, 2019, WWE announced that Kay Lee Ray and Jazzy Gabert had been signed to a contract by WWE and will be performing in their NXT UK.

On March 27, 2019 , WWE announced that Piper Niven had been signed to a contract by WWE and will be performing in their NXT UK.

On August 14, 2019, WWE announced that Santana Garrett had been signed to a contract by WWE and will be performing in their developmental territory NXT.

See also 
 Cruiserweight Classic
 Dusty Rhodes Tag Team Classic

References

External links 
 

2017
2017 WWE Network events
2017 in Nevada
2017 in professional wrestling in Florida
Events in Paradise, Nevada
Events in Florida
Professional wrestling shows in the Las Vegas Valley
Professional wrestling in Winter Park, Florida
July 2017 events in the United States
September 2017 events in the United States